Jonah Sanford (November 30, 1790 – December 25, 1867) was an American lawyer, jurist, and War of 1812 veteran who served briefly as a U.S. Representative from New York from 1830 to 1831.

He was a great-grandfather of Rollin Brewster Sanford.

Biography 
Born in Cornwall, Vermont, Sanford attended the district schools.
He moved to Hopkinton, New York, in 1811.
Enlisted as a volunteer for the War of 1812 and participated in the battle at Plattsburgh, September 11, 1814.
He was appointed Justice of the Peace in 1818 and served for twenty-two years.
He studied law.
He was admitted to the bar and practiced in Franklin County.
Town Supervisor of Hopkinton 1823-1826.
Commissioned a captain of Volunteer Cavalry in 1827.

War of 1812 
He was promoted to lieutenant colonel in 1828, colonel in 1831, and brigadier general of state militia in 1832 and 1833.

Political career 
He was a member of the New York State Assembly in 1829 and 1830.

Sanford was elected as a Jacksonian to the Twenty-first Congress to fill the vacancy caused by the resignation of Silas Wright, Jr., and served from November 3, 1830, to March 3, 1831.

Career after Congress 
He served as judge of the court of common pleas 1831-1837.
He served as delegate to the convention to revise the State constitution in 1846.
He became a Republican upon the formation of that party in 1856.
During the American Civil War, Sanford raised the 92nd New York Volunteer Infantry and was elected its colonel.

Death 
He died in Hopkinton, St. Lawrence County, New York, on December 25, 1867.
He was interred in Hopkinton Cemetery.

Family 
His son Jonah Sanford, Jr. (born 1821) was a member of the State Assembly in 1874.

Sources

1790 births
1867 deaths
People from Cornwall, Vermont
American militia generals
Union Army colonels
Jacksonian members of the United States House of Representatives from New York (state)
19th-century American politicians
Members of the United States House of Representatives from New York (state)